The 2019–20 Elitedivisionen also known as Gjensidige Kvindeligaen is the 48th season of the highest women's football league in Denmark and is currently contested by 8 teams each year in Denmark. Brøndby IF are the defending champions and FC Nordsjælland made their debut in the league.

Fortuna Hjørring won the league for the 11th time in the club's history, while Odense Q and Ballerup-Skovlunde Fodbold relegated to Kvinde 1. division.

Effects of the COVID-19 pandemic 
On 6 March 2020, all sport in Denmark were locked down and banned during the coronavirus pandemic, until mid of April. In May, it was announced that the season would restart on 6 June and the remaining matches of the season would be played behind closed doors. The Championship round and the Qualification round, were reduced from a total of 10 matches to 5 matches, per team.

On 10 June 2020, it was decided to reopen stadiums for spectators, with up to 500 people.

Broadcasting
In May 2020, the Danish Football Union announced that they had signed a TV-deal with Discovery, Inc., where a number of matches will be shown on Eurosport 2 and Sport Live, as well as the streaming service Dplay.

Teams

Personnel and kits

Managerial changes

Results

Main round
Teams play each other twice. Top six advance to the championship round.

Championship round

Teams play five matches. Points are reset, but bonus points are awarded for the placement in the main round. 10 points for first place, 8 points for second place and then 6, 4, 2 and 0.

Qualification round
Teams play five matches, the first and second place are promoted to the league.

Top scorers

Source:

Regular season

Overall

Player of the Month

References

External links
 Stillinger og resultater dbu.dk
 Summary - Elitedivisionen on soccerway.com

2019-20
2019–20 domestic women's association football leagues
Women
1
Elitedivisionen, 2020